William McMillan (16 July 1872 – 1929) was a Scottish professional footballer who played at half-back for Heart of Midlothian and Southampton in the 1890s.

Football career

Early career
McMillan was born in Glasgow, Scotland but started his professional career in Edinburgh with Heart of Midlothian. During his time at "Hearts", the club were Scottish Football League First Division champions in 1894–95 and won the Scottish Cup in the following year. By the time the Cup Final was played, however, McMillan had moved to southern England to join Southampton of the Southern League.

Southampton 
McMillan made the move south in March 1896, and made his debut for the "Saints" at the Antelope Ground on 21 March, taking the place of Ernie Taylor in a 2–0 victory over eventual champions, Millwall Athletic. McMillan retained his place at right-half for the following season and along with Robert Buchanan, George Clawley and Jack Farrell was ever-present in both the League and FA Cup. McMillan was nicknamed "Punt" for his expert kicking talent and ability to clear the ball upfield.

At the end of McMillan's first full season, Southampton, now playing at the County Ground, took the Southern League title for the first of six occasions over the next eight years. He also helped Southampton reach the Second Round Proper of the FA Cup for the first time, where they went out to Newton Heath after a replay.

For the 1897–98 season, the Saints strengthened their side with several new signings. McMillan lost his regular place in the side to Samuel Meston who had moved forward to accommodate new signing Tom Nicol at right-back. McMillan made only seven appearances, including one at inside-left when he scored twice (against Northfleet on 11 April), before leaving the club in the summer of 1898.

Later career
He subsequently made three appearances for Burnley before returning to Scotland where he played a few matches for St Mirren and Morton before retiring.

Honours
Southampton
 Southern League championship: 1896–97

References

1872 births
1929 deaths
Footballers from Glasgow
Scottish footballers
Association football wing halves
Dykehead F.C. players
Heart of Midlothian F.C. players
Southampton F.C. players
Burnley F.C. players
Scottish Football League players
Southern Football League players
English Football League players
St Mirren F.C. players
Greenock Morton F.C. players
Arthurlie F.C. players
Date of death missing